Diviner, also referred to as the Diviner Lunar Radiometer Experiment (DLRE), is an infrared radiometer aboard NASA's Lunar Reconnaissance Orbiter, part of the Lunar Precursor Robotic Program which is studying the Moon. It has been used to create temperature maps of the Moon's surface, as well as detect ice deposits and surface composition.

On 9 October 2009, the Diviner team announced the detection of a hot spot on the Moon at the location of the LCROSS spacecraft impact site.

References

External links
 Diviner Lunar Radiometer Experiment at UCLA

Lunar Reconnaissance Orbiter
Spacecraft instruments
Radiometry